Reecha Sharma (also spelled Richa), is a Nepalese film actress, model, and video jockey. She was one of the ten semi-finalists of Miss Nepal 2007 pageant, and has been popular for her acting in music videos and ramps. She made her acting debut in the Nepali film First Love (2010). She then acted in Mero Love Story and Highway in 2011. The most successful box office movie of 2012 Loot marked a turning point in her acting career. She acted in a youth-focused movie Visa Girl in 2012, and critically acclaimed 2014 film Talakjung vs Tulke. In 2015, she played the role of a cop in the featured film Zindagi Rocks. She is also one of the judges of Nepali comedy reality show Comedy Champion.

Biography

Reecha Sharma was born in Dhangadhi, Nepal. She was raised in Kailali district. She now lives in Kathmandu.

National Award-winning actress Reecha Sharma is known for her character-driven movies that have set benchmark in the Nepali film industry. For Reecha, art has always been a means of exfoliating the un-obvious, which informs and fuels all human motives. She comes from the school that believes that art is not simply a means of entertainment but a medium for the process of self-actualisation, too. Not surprisingly, her characters often come from complex socio-political space, embodying the questions we are afraid to answer.

To a large extent, her celluloid persona reflects her own real-life concerns. Also an activist, Reecha is actively involved in various projects related to women and children empowerment. "Unless the activism is grounded on a firm conviction", she says, "it cannot survive the test of time." For her, the awareness of being a woman in a society, where they are deprived of fully realizing themselves individuals, gave impetus for the activism. Unlike many activists, she doesn't consider her activism a separate part of her career, but an inevitable extension of being a woman with a voice in the country, where they have been silenced for too long.

Reecha did her acting diploma from Mr Jack Walterz's. Constantly in search of good contemporary stories, potent with political awareness, she has recently forayed into production as well. For far Reecha Sharma has acted in 17 movies, two of which she produced herself.

She is married to Deepeksha Bikram Rana in December 2019 in Kathmandu. The actress was in a relationship with Rana for two years. He is the General Manager of Lalitpur-based Labim Mall; she gave birth to a son in September 2021.

Filmography

Reality TV Shows

Television series

Films

Awards

References

External links
 
 Reecha Sharma Nepali official website 

Living people
Year of birth missing (living people)
People from Kailali District
Nepalese film actresses
Nepalese female models
Nepalese beauty pageant winners
21st-century Nepalese actresses
Nepalese women film producers